Prestige class may refer to:

 A premium travel class designation:
Prestige Class of Korean Air, the class between Premium Economy and First Class
Prestige Class, a  premium class of service on Canada's Via Rail
 Prestige class (Dungeons & Dragons), a kind of character class
 Prestige class of the Renault Sport Trophy

See also
 Prestige (disambiguation)